@dril is a pseudonymous Twitter user best known for his idiosyncratic style of absurdist humor and non sequiturs. The account, its author, and the character associated with the tweets are all commonly referred to as dril (the account's identifier on Twitter) or wint (the account's display name), both rendered lowercase but often capitalized by others. Since his first tweet in 2008, dril has become a popular and influential Twitter user with more than 1.7 million followers.

Dril is one of the most notable accounts associated with "Weird Twitter", a subculture on the site that shares a surreal, ironic sense of humor. The character associated with dril is highly distinctive, often described as a bizarre reflection of a typical male American Internet user. Other social media users have repurposed dril's tweets for humorous or satiric effect in a variety of political and cultural contexts. Many of dril's tweets, phrases, and tropes have become familiar parts of Internet slang.

The author behind dril remained unknown for years, with the few available details about the author's life fueling speculation about his identity. In 2017, a piece from New York suggested the author’s identity, which was later confirmed by dril himself.

Beyond tweeting, dril has created animated short films and contributed illustrations and writing to other artists' collaborative projects. His first book, Dril Official "Mr. Ten Years" Anniversary Collection (2018), is a compilation of the account's "greatest hits" alongside new illustrations. In 2019 he announced the launch of a streaming web series called Truthpoint: Darkweb Rising, an InfoWars parody co-created with comedian Derek Estevez-Olsen for Adult Swim. Writers have praised dril for the originality and humor of his tweets; for example, poet Patricia Lockwood said of him: "he is a master of tone, he is a master of character".

Biography 
Before the Twitter account, dril was a poster at the Something Awful forums under the name "gigantic drill". According to former Something Awful admin David Thorpe, dril was "just a guy who was posting funny stuff on there", but never one of the site's featured front page writers. Dril posted his first Tweet—the single word "no"—on September 15, 2008.

Dril then remained silent on Twitter for nine months before his second tweet—"how do i get cowboy paint off a dog."—and has posted regularly in the years since.

Identity
Initially, little was known about the anonymous author of the dril account. When asked about the account's anonymity during a private Q&A in 2017, dril responded "i am an almost 30 year old man and i could not really care less about the Authenticity of the platform i use to convey dick jokes." Jacob Bakkila, one of the writers behind the @Horse_ebooks Twitter account, claimed in 2013 that dril had once hired him for a project. Bakkila told BuzzFeed that dril's author was a graphic designer living somewhere in the New York metropolitan tri-state area. BuzzFeeds John Herrman and Katie Notopoulos speculated that dril may be a collaborative project or that Bakkila himself was behind dril. Bakkila denied the rumor that he was dril, adding that dril was "a friend" who had contributed to the @Horse_ebooks sequel, Bear Stearns Bravo.

On November 16, 2017, a Tumblr post identifying dril's author by his real name went viral. Other posts identifying dril's author existed as early as 2014 on Tumblr, Twitter, and Reddit, but these earlier posts had not gone viral or been publicized in the media. The 2017 post identified dril through "informed guesswork" founded on other clues, including a LinkedIn page associated with Bear Stearns Bravo and a writing credit on Hiveswap, an adventure game set in the universe of Andrew Hussie's long-running webcomic Homestuck.

The Tumblr post was described by the press as a "doxing": an unwelcome broadcasting of private personal information online. The post was met with backlash and dismay among Twitter users, many of whom voiced a preference for keeping dril's personal identity a mystery and preserving the author's privacy. According to Jozefien Wouters, writing for the Belgian news magazine Knack:

The author addressed the doxing on his Patreon page, writing "everything's normal. i guess im  'doxxed' now. sorry. it's fine. i  really give a shit." In a Reddit "ask us anything" interview, dril confirmed that he had worked on Hiveswap. He said the personal impact of the doxing had been minimal, adding that people had been "surprisingly normal" and he had no "sordid past" to hide, but also described being outed as "my Cross to bear" and said "theres nothing scandalous enough there to make it worth publicizing and looking like an ass hole while doing so."

In August 2018, dril announced that he was transferring the publishing rights of his tweets to Paul Dochney, whom he called his "Agent And Master", for the purpose of publishing his first book. Some reporters subsequently identified dril as Dochney. In a 2020 Reddit AMA, dril commented, "i doxxed myself so amazon would give me permission to publish my other book last year. im some guy named paul dochney who cares big whoop," seemingly confirming his identity as Paul Dochney.

Character and writing style

The author behind the @dril account writes in character, using an avatar of a blurry image of Jack Nicholson smiling and wearing sunglasses. Although there is no clear narrative, dril's "voice" or "character", generally understood to be male, is consistently recognizable. Writer Alexander McDonough called dril a "grinning Jack Nicholson with severe persecution and self-esteem issues, poor physical health, and a bizarre love/hate relationship with cops." Bijan Stephen at The Verge likened dril to an online version of the "wise fool" stock character. 
 
Critics have described dril's voice as an amalgamation of ordinary Internet users, most of all those who are arrogant, obsessive, ignorant, or hapless. Professor of English literature Roger Bellin describes the character of dril as "generally a recognizable type: a self-important buffoon who's often raging out (show yourself, coward), or other times preening (buddy, they won't even let me), over some bit of nonsense that we're all meant to realize is absurdly unimportant." Vice reviewer Rachel Pick describes dril as "a bumbling, maladapted fool ... a pudgy, oily man, frequently in a state of undress, who doesn’t go through life as much as he is spilled across it." According to The A.V. Clubs Clayton Purdom, dril is a sort of patron saint of Internet users, or "your uncle's search history come to life and filtered through a scabrous comic sensibility, and ... possibly the most popular, beloved man on the entire internet (after, maybe, The Rock)." Will Shaw of The Oxford Student noted the familiarity of dril's "naive appeals to moderation" and "flame war posturing", and said dril the character "is the internet's collective id, given form", while the writer behind @dril is "the internet equivalent of the Beowulf-poet; we may never know who he really is, but we recognise when he is being channelled." Christine Erickson at Mashable said dril's character was like "a spambot equivalent to the kind of crazy that Clint Eastwood portrays". At Kotaku, Gita Jackson called dril a "joke account that also inadvertently catalogues ... every way to be mad online".

In a lecture given at the University of Pennsylvania, American poet Patricia Lockwood described dril as a literary alter ego of Twitter users and the Internet in general. Comparing the account's persona to Ignatius J. Reilly, the protagonist of John Kennedy Toole's novel A Confederacy of Dunces (1980), Lockwood cited dril as an example of new possibilities in first-person narrative that could be explored online. Lockwood said of dril:

Dril's tweets are, in the words of Jordan Sargent at Gawker, a series of "quietly seething and unhinged avant-garde scribblings". His tweets are deliberately peppered with odd typos like misspelled words, grammatical mistakes, punctuation errors, and eggcorns. Yohann Koshy in Vice said dril's writing "reads like obscene nonsense verse—the syntax mutilated, the humour irredeemable". In the preface to his first book, dril called his writing style "Prestige Short Prose". Pick suggested that the phrase was likely "meant to make fun of the snobby lit theory types who want to make Dril out to be some highbrow art project", but she concluded it was an apt term to describe dril's style of "part art form, part jokes to read on the toilet". Pick also compared dril's writing to the surreal one-liner jokes of Jack Handey and the flash fiction short story "For sale: baby shoes, never worn". Jonah Engel Bromwich, in The New York Times, said dril was a major influence on the spread of dialogue, written in the same method as screenwriting, as a comedic writing style on Twitter.

Dril has been identified as one of the "most revered" and "quintessential" accounts associated with the "Weird Twitter" scene, a loose subculture of associated users who share a surreal, ironic, subversive sense of humor. dril was one of many Weird Twitter personalities who migrated to Twitter from Something Awful's FYAD board and carried over the forum's in-jokes and tone. Like others on Weird Twitter, dril's tweets have been described as having a dadaist sensibility. Writing for Complex, Brenden Gallagher compared dril to a musician who refuses to sell out or an auteurist indie filmmaker, as Twitter's version of "the enigmatic figure that even [an art form's] best known practitioners look to with reverence". Sean T. Collins described dril's humor as a "blend of fist-on-the-table bluster, abject confusion and burned-toast syntax", noting the influence of surreal humor found in Monty Python (especially the sketches from their show Monty Python's Flying Circus and Terry Gilliam's animations) and Adult Swim shows like Space Ghost Coast to Coast and Tim and Eric Awesome Show, Great Job! Collins called dril's tweets "a new way to be funny, with a rhythm and vocabulary all their own. I love it."

Motivation and satirical elements 
Most of dril's writing is understood to be absurd, surreal, ironic, or nonsensical. An article about dril in The Oxford Student singled out this 2011 dril tweet as the account's guiding "manifesto":

Providing an ostensibly out-of-character statement to BuzzFeed for an oral history on "Weird Twitter" in 2013, dril commented on the nature of his work and motivation:

 
In a 2017 Reddit AMA, he commented:

Dan Hitchens at Christian journal First Things noted, in an article about the use of irony on social media, that "[m]uch of the art of Twitter consists in appearing to put forward a position while giving the impression that you might be kidding", citing American author David Foster Wallace's warnings about the pervasiveness of irony in modern culture. According to Hitchens, dril is the "cult account that towers above the rest" in his mastery of irony, and dril's "inspired errors in spelling, logic, and decorum can only be produced by a clever creator, but the creator never lets the mask slip. Half the joke is our joint awareness of @dril's lack of self-awareness."

Although dril's content is typically absurd or nonsensical, some have noted an undercurrent of satire or social commentary in dril's tweets. Surveying Weird Twitter for Complex, Gallagher commented that dril's "vicious satire of conservatives, gamers, conspiracy theorists, and other less savory aspects of the Internet is always on point, always hilarious, always in character." Fellow Weird Twitter user @rare_basement said dril's "trolling [of] Penn State fans during the molestation scandal was so brilliant, always on the right side of the issue, but super funny and subtle about it." Although dril does not avow an explicit political identity, the account's politics are generally identified as leftist, an alignment common among Weird Twitter users. However, the abstraction and vagueness of dril's tweets have allowed them to be spread and repurposed by people of varying ideologies across the political spectrum. Celebrities, journalists, and former members of both Republican and Democratic presidential administrations follow dril, and even the far-right Breitbart News has quoted dril on its Twitter feed.

Influence

Impact on Internet slang 

References to dril's tweets have become part of the vernacular of Internet slang. Some of dril's distinctive phrases have become so ubiquitous that they are used even by those who are unaware of the phrases' origin. Although dril's biggest influence is on Twitter, his tweets are also popular on other social media platforms—for example, meme-aggregating groups on Facebook commonly share his content, and several Tumblr users and trends have referenced and been influenced by dril. There was a Know Your Meme guide to dril in 2014, at a time when KYM pages for individual Twitter users were comparatively rare.

A common piece of conventional wisdom on Twitter holds that it is possible to find a dril Tweet that corresponds to virtually any situation or statement, leading to the saying "There's always a dril Tweet." As an example, the dril Tweet below has been widely referenced after a person apologizes for making a dramatically offensive and obviously incorrect statement:

As described by Purdom, finding the dril tweet that matches an event or statement has become an online parlor game, made possible because dril had "rendered a tightly written comedic exaggeration of every daily outrage and conflict from the news cycle in which we find ourselves trapped." Purdom also found that dril's early preoccupations and sensibility had an outsized, "Velvet Underground-like influence on the tenor of the internet to come." By the end of 2017, the staff of Deadspin declared that "comparing everything to @dril" was a trend that "should die" in 2018, asserting that dril himself remained funny but dril comparisons had become an overused, lazy trope, because too many Twitter users were relying on dril references "as a substitute for an actual joke." Until 2021, dril's first tweet, "no", was used by dril as his "pinned tweet", a feature of Twitter that allows one tweet the user considers to be particularly important to be "pinned" out of chronological order at the top of a Twitter feed. Despite, or because of, its lack of context, it has amassed thousands of likes and retweets. According to Will Oremus at Slate, the popularity of the "no" tweet is an example of how "The metadata is the message" on social media, as metrics like retweets provide important context and carry independent meaning, akin to a laugh track on TV.

Satirical recontextualization 
Other social media users frequently quote, recontextualize, or remix dril tweets for their own satirical purposes, and some accounts are even exclusively dedicated to this purpose. One such account, @EveryoneIsDril, shares screenshots of tweets by other people that look like dril's typing mannerisms. Another, "wint MP" or @parliawint, attaches dril tweets styled like teletext closed captions to images from BBC News of British politicians and journalists speaking. Although seemingly niche, the wint MP account garnered 14,000 followers by May 2017. Tom dissonance, the creator of wint MP, attributed the account's success to its functioning as a joke on multiple levels, and for multiple audiences: "there are people who get the in-jokey references; there's a broader level of people who get politics and dril, and understand the significance of one commenting on another; and beyond that there are people who just appreciate an official figure in a suit saying something ridiculous. It's an onion of silliness." Koshy commented that wint MP "stands out from traditional forms of satire because it has no normative force. It recommends nothing about the way things should be. The political field it presents is slack-jawed, demented, putrid and amoral – there is no value beyond the scope of its image."

Not all satirical riffing on dril is political in nature; for example, the account @drilmagic attracted thousands of followers presenting mashups of dril tweets and cards from the game Magic: The Gathering. Ben Wilinofsky, a card player who contributed to @drilmagic, said the account and its format became a success because "Magic has a very self-serious lore that is great foil for an account that so often has the self-serious in its crosshairs." Several attempts have been made to create AI text generators (often manually curated) that create messages in the style of dril tweets.

Comparisons to Donald Trump

There are several people whose voices on social media are often compared to dril's—the musician and actor Ice-T is one—but Donald Trump is likely the most common comparison. Commentators have frequently compared dril to Trump (and vice versa), particularly Trump's voice on Twitter and other social media platforms. According to Purdom, "Both are aging, endlessly aggrieved white men who seemingly do not understand core components of the internet, yet they perfectly embody its anonymous rage, its ability to turn people into lunatics being swarmed and eaten alive by enemies and trolls."

In a 2016 article for New York magazine, Brian Feldman argued that Trump should choose dril as his vice-presidential running mate—a position that was later filled by then-Governor of Indiana Mike Pence—because the writer perceived commonalities between dril's "incoherent, libidinous, authoritarian comment-spam" and Trump's own campaign tweeting. In a joke about Trump's use of social media, journalist and MSNBC host Chris Hayes said that protestors should yell at Trump to log off to "see if they can get him to recreate that @dril Tweet", a reference to the following:

Eve Peyser, in a Gizmodo article declaring the 2016 presidential election was "the Weird Twitter election", had earlier compared the same dril tweet to the "tone, structure and message" of a Trump tweet. David Covucci at The Daily Dot coined "Dril's Law", an adage stating that "[f]or every single thing Donald Trump has tweeted, Dril did it earlier and better." Covucci also asked: "What if Donald Trump is @dril? Would it be any stranger than Donald Trump being president of the United States?" Responding to Covucci's question, Anna North wrote in The New York Times that "another explanation" for the similarity between dril and Trump "seems more likely: Donald Trump's Twitter presence isn't absurdist, it's just absurd."

"Corncob" 

In 2011, dril tweeted the following:

The tweet describes an argument or similar situation in which one participant has clearly been "owned" but refuses to acknowledge it or to take a break, instead doubling down and insisting beyond any credibility that they have not been owned.

Shortly after it was posted, Twitter users began to use screenshots of the corncob tweet to point out when a person refused to acknowledge losing an argument or suffering some other humiliation. By 2017, the word "corncob" by itself had become common slang on Twitter for this purpose. The Ringers Kate Knibbs observed that, while "corncob" as slang remained limited to communities on Twitter, the "corncob" archetype is universal and identifiable throughout contemporary culture. According to Knibbs, "the condition of being a corn cob—of allowing yourself to be defined by and reduced to a piercing insistence that a perceived slight has not diminished you—[has] spread far beyond a small corner of Twitter." Among public figures whose behavior was described as fitting the "corncob" archetype, Knibbs listed Donald Trump, WikiLeaks founder Julian Assange, actress Louise Linton, Kim Kardashian's friend Jonathan Cheban, Kanye West (noting his numerous outbursts and 2016 song "Famous"), and Taylor Swift (noting her 2017 song "Look What You Made Me Do").

The term "corncob" became controversial after the reference was used in a meme with leftist criticisms of then-Senator (and later Vice President) Kamala Harris. The political commentator Al Giordano asserted, citing a dated Urban Dictionary definition of "corncobbed", that "[e]very cretin who has spread this meme needs to reckon with how it uses 'corncob', a rape culture and homophobic term popular among dudebros", confusing the word with the slang term cornhole. Neera Tanden, the president of the Center for American Progress and an advisor on Hillary Clinton's 2016 campaign, called on a Twitter user—an Ohio State student—to "denounce" the corncob meme. Various news publications reported on the story, and noted that the fast pace of Twitter discourse and unusual slang and in-jokes meant that a misunderstanding risked embarrassment and mocking. Amelia Tait, writer of an "internet dictionary" column in the New Statesman, even wrote that Giordano had "exposed [himself] as ignorant of online culture" and had, himself, been corncobbed.

The term resurfaced in March 2019, when the official campaign account for Senate Majority Leader Mitch McConnell used it to ridicule Alexandria Ocasio-Cortez by superimposing an image of a corncob onto Ocasio-Cortez's face. In turn, dril replied to McConnell's account with a link to an instructional YouTube video on how to express a dog's anal glands.

Family and other characters
Dril tweets often refer to his relationships with family members—particularly an unnamed wife/ex-wife, and numerous sons—in a manner reminiscent of father figures in American sitcoms like Married... with Children. Tom Whyman for The Outline described dril as "at once married and divorced (from the same essential 'wife')". Jia Tolentino, a staff writer for The New Yorker, credited dril as an originator of the "large adult son" trope. The trope, which Tolentino described as commonplace across social media and especially online sports journalism, involves particular observations of hapless male behavior that is "endlessly excusable: though [the large adult son] does nothing right, he can do no wrong." The character of dril repeatedly refers to his "sons", who are usually involved in the kind of "classic large-adult-son behavior" Tolentino describes as "alarming, with a whiff of the surreal". The sons are compared to Trump's sons, particularly Donald Jr. and Eric Trump, as well as Mike Huckabee's sons. dril's regular posts about his disastrous marriage have also been compared to the wife guy stereotype that became popular in the late 2010s, of a man who gains attention on social media for posting about his wife, although dril's posts on the subject predate the emergence of this stereotype.

Besides the character's family, other fictitious recurring characters in dril's tweets are an internet user named 'digimonotis', with whom dril is locked in a flame war after a prior falling-out, and "the boys", a group of friends with similarly bizarre personality characteristics to dril.

"(((Keebler Elves)))" controversy 
In June 2016, dril drew controversy for a tweet that used triple parentheses around the name of the corporate mascots of the cookie company Keebler:

Triple parentheses, or "echoes", are used online by the alt-right as an antisemitic symbol to highlight the names of Jews. Journalist Jay Hathaway wrote that most of dril's followers understood the tweet to be an ironic joke exploring the uncertain "etiquette around this very 2016 expression of bigotry ... Can a non-Jew apply the (((echoes))) to his own name as a show of allyship? Is it OK to use the parentheses in a joke at the white supremacists' expense? There’s no clear consensus."

As the "(((Keebler Elves)))" tweet spread, some far-right accounts praised dril, interpreting the tweet as a covert signal of genuine antisemitic views. Others criticized the tweet as bigoted, even if the intent was ironic, or at least in poor taste. In response to the controversy, dril alternated between dismissing those who believed he was an antisemite and making sarcastic promises to become "less racist" with the help of donations. Writer Alexander McDonough said dril's "refusal to clarify his views speaks to his trust in his audience to 'get' his jokes" and to dril's confidence in his privacy. "Likewise," McDonough wrote, "[dril's] audience trusts him to make pointed satire that crosses boundaries but is never hateful. The joke is always on himself or an entrenched elite, dril never punches down." According to McDonough, the controversy did not seem to have any long-term impact on dril's popularity. In the Jewish magazine Tablet, Armin Rosen called the tweet "an obviously satirical performance of anti-Jewish bigotry" and "the only funny anti-Semitism meta-controversy in the history of the internet."

Other projects
In addition to his tweets, dril has many visual art side projects and collaborations with other artists. dril has made several animations, including a short film titled COW-BOY and a fictional series about the attempts of South Park co-creator Trey Parker and Green Day drummer Tré Cool to rename the month of April "Treypril/Trépril" and "one policeman's mission to stop them at any cost." dril has expressed interest in creating further animated films, but said he would prefer to work on projects separate from his "dril" identity.

Dril worked on Bear Stearns Bravo, an interactive video series that was the sequel to the Horse ebooks Twitter account. For the November 2014 issue Paper magazine, which famously featured Kim Kardashian on the cover, dril contributed an article on how to "break the Internet". Dril designed the cover of the 2016 vaporwave/funk album Cyber-Vision by Drew Fairweather ("Drew Toothpaste"), best known for the webcomics Toothpaste for Dinner and Married to the Sea. Dril wrote for Hiveswap, a 2017 video game based on the webcomic Homestuck. Sweet Bro and Hella Jeff and the Quest for the Missing Spoon, a book based on a story within a story in Homestuck, lists dril as a contributing author and artist alongside Homestuck creator Andrew Hussie and Gunshow author KC Green. Dril was one of several artists who contributed illustrations for the card game The Devil's Level, based on the Twitter account da share z0ne.

In October 2019, dril announced that he and comedian Derek Estevez-Olsen were launching a web series called Truthpoint: Darkweb Rising for Adult Swim. The show, a parody of InfoWars, streams from Adult Swim's website on Wednesdays at midnight. In the series, dril is depicted wearing a mask. In February 2021, dril, Estevez-Olsen, and collaborator Pierce Campion released the short Virtual Prison as a pilot for a potential series on Adult Swim.

In February 2021, dril announced that he had begun developing a side-scrolling video game in his spare time, having done all the coding and artwork by himself until that point. With the working title copgame, the project "follows the quest of a silent protagonist who stumbles upon the gift of immortality in a dangerous future where Top Influencers and corrupt hollywood guys maintain a cruel grip on society."

Books

In January 2017, dril opened a Patreon account for fans to make monthly payments in support of his tweets and various future projects, including "video, illustration, and long-form writing." On the Patreon, dril described his plans for two book projects: an elaborate art book "with a narrative adjacent to the 'Mythos' surrounding my posts" and a "best of"-style compilation of tweets as a coffee table book with bonus content. By October 2017, the account received $2,200 a month from fans.

Dril published his first book, Dril Official "Mr. Ten Years" Anniversary Collection, in August 2018. The book compiles the account's best tweets from its first ten years, as selected by the author, along with new original illustrations. A second book, The Get Rich and Become God Method, was published in 2020. His third, The Dril Archives, was published in December of 2022. It contains 10,000 posts and was released simultaneously in four editions, each being a different ordering: chronologically (titled Eternal), alphabetically (Refined), by most likes (Beloved) and randomly (Chaotic).

Reception and following 

Over time, dril has grown from a relatively obscure Twitter account with a small cult following to a widely followed, well-known account on the site. In October 2012, dril had only 23,000 followers. That number had grown to 166,000 by December 2014, and then 567,000 by May 2017. As of January 2021, dril had reached 1.6million followers. Unlike most comedians with large Twitter followings, dril became popular without a public reputation or career outside of the platform.

Following dril has often been described—sometimes in a half-serious or tongue-in-cheek manner, other times sincerely—as one of the few good uses of Twitter. In November 2017, shortly after the doxing incident, dril was called "arguably the most iconic Twitter account in the history of social media [and] practically internet royalty" in The A.V. Club and "one of the internet's most unlikely treasures" in Slate. In December 2019, Katie Notopoulos of BuzzFeed News called dril "Without a doubt [...] the most important person on Twitter of the 2010s."

Dril's writing has been praised by a variety of public figures, including poet Patricia Lockwood; comedian and actor Rob Delaney; writer and The New Yorker staff writer Adrian Chen; and Reply All hosts PJ Vogt and Alex Goldman. In 2019, British writer Tom Whyman argued (in earnest) that dril should be considered for the Nobel Prize in Literature as "the one true poet of the internet age"; in Whyman's view, recognizing dril's writing as literature would be equivalent to historical shifts in the definition of "art" prompted by avant-garde works by artists like Marcel Duchamp and Andy Warhol.

Acclaim for the account generally 
@dril is frequently listed among the funniest or best Twitter accounts. In 2012, The Daily Dot cited dril as one of the funniest accounts on Twitter and noted that reading dril's "[d]arkly funny ... odd, provocative, and clever" tweets "simultaneously brings a sense of head-scratching wonder and slightly uncomfortable chortles." Max Read, then an editor of Gawker, named dril one of the publication's "heroes" of 2013 in a year-in-review piece. According to Read, dril's writing stood out in a paranoid web landscape overrun by spambots and covert corporate marketing:

Paste included dril on its lists of best Twitter accounts every year between 2013 and 2016, and the comedy site Splitsider (later merged into Vulture) named dril one of the funniest accounts of 2017. For a March 2019 feature commemorating the 30th anniversary of Tim Berners-Lee's invention of the World Wide Web, The Verge listed @dril among the greatest websites, people, and technologies in web history. Later that year, The A.V. Club ranked dril sixth on its list of the "best, worst, and weirdest things" on the Internet in the 2010s.

Acclaim for individual tweets 
Individual dril tweets have also been lauded by the press. At the occasion of Twitter's tenth anniversary, both GQ and Newsweek named this dril tweet among the best and/or funniest tweets of all time:

The same tweet had also been listed among the site's funniest by BuzzFeed in 2014. The "corncob" tweet was listed as the 8th most "canonical" tweet of all time in 2017 by Mic, whose Miles Klee wrote it was "categorically impossible" to select the single best dril tweet. Another dril tweet—"IF THE ZOO BANS ME FOR HOLLERING AT THE ANIMALS I WILL FACE GOD AND WALK BACKWARDS INTO HELL"—was ranked among the site's "greatest" by Thought Catalog in 2013. Slate counted one of his tweets among the best sentences written in 2017, ranking dril alongside such writers as Umberto Eco, Ta-Nehisi Coates, Anne Carson, Mohsin Hamid, Jennifer Egan, Durga Chew-Bose, John Darnielle, and Daniel Dennett.

See also 
 Twitterature
 Horse ebooks
 da share z0ne
 Ken M
 Extremely Online

Notes

References

dril tweets and posts

Secondary sources

External links 

dril online:
 @dril on Twitter
 wint.co – dril's homepage

Collections of dril's best tweets:
 "@dril's Greatest Hits" — a 2012 list at Something Awful
 "The 15 Most Important @dril Tweets of All-Time" — a 2017 list at CollegeHumor
 "15 Hilarious Tweets That Will Make You Want to Follow Dril on Twitter" — a 2017 list at The Things
 "Dril Tweet Bracket is the Internet's Criterion Collection " – 2018 article at Geek.com about a tournament bracket of dril's 64 best tweets curated by Twitter user @VT_Ben
 @VT_Ben's completed bracket on Twitter, with results based on polls

Twitter accounts
Weird Twitter
Living people
Pseudonymous writers
21st-century American comedians
American humorists
American satirists
Internet properties established in 2008
American Internet celebrities
Internet humor
Internet slang
Electronic literature writers
American illustrators
American animators
American animated film directors
American surrealist artists
Aphorists
Writers who illustrated their own writing
Absurdist fiction
Black comedy
Year of birth missing (living people)